Alucita thapsina is a moth of the family Alucitidae. It is found in Sri Lanka.

This species has a wingspan of 21mm.

References

Moths described in 1905
Alucitidae
Moths of Sri Lanka
Taxa named by Edward Meyrick